Live at Ventura Theatre is a live performance DVD featuring the rock band Switchfoot. It was recorded live March 29, 2007 on one of the stops during the band's spring leg of the Oh! Gravity. Tour. It is the first DVD to be released under the band's own label, lowercase people records. The DVD features the performance, as well as a short mini-documentary about the event.

The DVD was first released on the band's online store November 21, 2007 and began December 9, 2007.

Track listing
 Stars
 Politicians
 Oh! Gravity.
 This Is Your Life
 Learning To Breathe
 Yesterdays
 Gone
 American Dream
 On Fire
 Faust, Midas, and Myself
 The Shadow Proves The Sunshine
 Awakening
 Meant To Live
 Only Hope
 Dare You To Move

Bonus Songs
 Company Car
 Burn Out Bright
 We Are One Tonight

Notes
Notable for their absence are the songs "Dirty Second Hands" and "Ammunition," arguably two of the band's more energetic live numbers. Fans who went to this concert reported on the band's forums that those two songs were indeed performed at the show, but were most likely left off the DVD because the performances of those songs were not as strong as usual.
The "Bonus Songs" were actually from the same show. It is unknown why they were curiously moved to a "bonus songs" section.
After the song, "American Dream," Jon Foreman plays the impromptu "Ventura Song" with his guitar and harmonica, while the band plays along. The song then immediately segues into "On Fire."

External links
 DVD at Bandfarm

Concert films
Christian live video albums